Xinyuan Real Estate Co., Ltd. is a Chinese real estate company.

Xinyuan has traditionally engaged principally in residential real estate development and the provision of property management services, focusing on Tier II cities in China.

History
Xinyuan is a real estate developer building large-scale residential projects for middle-income consumers in China's Tier II cities. The company was founded in 1997 in Zhengzhou, China and puts up developments aimed at providing middle-income consumers with a community lifestyle. Xinyuan's business model emphasizes high asset turnover, efficient working capital management and strict cost control.

Xinyuan's projects in China extend to Tier II cities: Chengdu, Hefei, Jinan, Kunshan, Suzhou, and Zhengzhou.  They have a total of 26 projects and more than 3 million square meters of GFA developed, under construction and under planning.

On December 7, 2005, Forte (Group) Co. Ltd announced that its subsidiary Shanghai Xinyuan Real Estate Development Co. Ltd had successfully acquired 30% stake of Shanghai Baisi Property Co. 

Xinyuan's holding company is based in the Cayman Islands. On 18 April 2008, Xinyuan's corporate headquarters was relocated from Zhengzhou to Beijing. On 12 December 2007, Xinyuan made an initial public offering, becoming the first Chinese real estate developer to become listed on the New York Stock Exchange. Underwritten by Merrill Lynch, Deutsche Bank Securities, and Allen & Co, Xinyuan's initial public offering raised US$245m in capital. China Analyst reports that Xinyuan's stock is the 2nd fastest growing within its respective industry as of March 2010.

Xinyuan was selected as one of "China's Sixty Best Employers for 2007" in a survey conducted by China Central Television. The China Real Estate Top 10 Committee has selected Xinyuan as one of "China's Top 10 Overseas-Listed Real Estate Developers", and has awarded it the "Top 100 Chinese Real Estate Companies with Greatest Growth Potential Award" once, and the "Top 100 Chinese Real Estate Companies Award" thrice consecutively.

In 2009, Xinyuan purchased a portion of the real estate portfolio of prolific Brooklyn real estate developer Isaac Hager who declared bankruptcy. In 2012, the company entered the United States real estate market as XIN Development Group International, Inc. With a development in Brooklyn, New York, it became the first Chinese developer with a major project in the United States.

In 2017, Lizhou Zhang succeeded Xinqi Wang as CEO.

Services and subsidiaries
Xinyuan provides landscaping and intercom systems installation services through two of its 11 subsidiaries, Zhengzhou Mingyuan Landscape Engineering Co., Ltd. and Zhengzhou Xinyuan Computer Network Engineering Co., Ltd.

Joint ventures
Xinyuan has joint ventures with Blue Ridge Capital, China Construction Bank, and Equity International.

Projects
As of 2007, Xinyuan had 13 completed projects and 14 in development or planning.

See also
Real estate in China
Beijing Financial Street

References

External links
Xinyuan Real Estate Company website

Companies listed on the New York Stock Exchange
Real estate companies of China
Companies based in Beijing
Real estate companies established in 1997